Elreen Ann Quinilitan Ando (born November 1, 1998) is a Filipino weightlifter.

Career
A native of Carreta, Cebu City, Ando became part of the Philippine national weightlifting team after she was scouted by coaches Garry Toleno and former olympian Ramon Solis  when she was still a junior high school student at the University of Cebu (UC). As a result, UC then granted her a collegiate scholarship.

Ando participated at the 2020 Asian Weightlifting Championships in Tashkent, Uzbekistan where she clinched three medals: bronze in snatch, silver in the clean and jerk, and another silver for the overall lift.

Ando competed in the -64 kg women's weightlifting event of the 2020 Summer Olympics. She qualified through the Absolute Continental Ranking. She placed seventh overall, but set new personal bests in the process.

Major results

References

External links
 

1998 births
Filipino female weightlifters
Competitors at the 2019 Southeast Asian Games
Southeast Asian Games silver medalists for the Philippines
Southeast Asian Games medalists in weightlifting
Weightlifters at the 2018 Asian Games
Asian Games competitors for the Philippines
University of Cebu alumni
Living people
Weightlifters at the 2020 Summer Olympics
Sportspeople from Cebu City
Olympic weightlifters of the Philippines
Competitors at the 2021 Southeast Asian Games
21st-century Filipino women